Nour Benzekri is an Algerian football manager.

References

Year of birth missing (living people)
Living people
Algerian football managers
JS Kabylie managers
JSM Béjaïa managers
ASO Chlef managers
NA Hussein Dey managers
Algerian Ligue Professionnelle 1 managers
21st-century Algerian people